Operation Brochet took place during the French Indochina War, between August and October, 1953. A combined arms operation, Brochet involved 18 battalions of the French Expeditionary and Vietnamese National Armies fighting against the 42nd and 50th Viet Minh Regiments, fighting in the southern reaches of the Red River Delta near Tonkin in North Vietnam. The 1st and 2nd Parachute Battalions of the French Foreign Legion (BEP), and the 1st and 3rd Colonial Parachute Battalions (BPC) took part, as did forces of the Vietnamese National Army. Their objective was to sweep the Delta and remove Viet Minh influence.

Brochet enjoyed only limited success. By October 11, 1 BEP had lost 96 men against only 10 confirmed Viet Minh war dead, and despite French efforts between 5,000 and 7,000 of the Delta villages remained under Viet Minh control.

Notes

References
Online

 

Printed

 
 
 
 
 

Battles involving Vietnam
Military operations involving France
Battles and operations of the First Indochina War
Conflicts in 1953
1953 in French Indochina
Vietnamese independence movement
1953 in Vietnam
August 1953 events in Asia
October 1953 events in Asia
September 1953 events in Asia
History of Nam Định Province